The NACA cowling is a type of aerodynamic fairing used to streamline radial engines installed on airplanes. It was developed by Fred Weick of the National Advisory Committee for Aeronautics (NACA) in 1927. It was a major advance in aerodynamic drag reduction, and paid for its development and installation costs many times over due to the gains in fuel efficiency that it enabled.

History and design
The NACA cowling enhanced speed through drag reduction while delivering improved engine cooling. 

The cowling consists of a symmetric, circular airfoil that is wrapped around the engine. In a normal planar airfoil, like a wing, it is the difference in airspeed, and their associated changes in pressure, on the top and bottom of the surface that produces lift. In the case of the NACA cowl, the ring-shaped airfoil is positioned so this lift effect is forward, producing thrust. This thrust does not counteract the total drag of the cowl, but greatly reduces its overall value.

The difference in airspeed on the two sides is due not only to the shape of the airfoil, but also the presence of the cylinders on the inside surface, which serves to further slow the airflow. Nevertheless, the total airflow through the cowl is generally greater than it would be with no cowl as the air is sucked through the cowl by the air flowing around it. This has the side-effect of keeping the fast moving air primarily on the cylinder heads where it is most needed, as opposed to flowing between and into the cylinders and crankcase where it does little for cooling. Furthermore, turbulence after the air passes the free-standing cylinders is greatly reduced. The sum of all these effects reduces drag by as much as 60%. The test conclusions resulted in almost every radial-engined aircraft being equipped with this cowling, starting in 1932.

The test aircraft, a Curtiss AT-5A Hawk biplane, featuring a Wright Whirlwind J-5 radial engine, reached an airspeed of  equipped with the NACA cowling compared to  without it.

The idea that the NACA cowling produced thrust through the Meredith effect is fallacious—although in theory the expansion of the air as it was heated by the engine could create some thrust by exiting at high speed, in practice this required a cowling designed and shaped to achieve the high-speed exit of air required (which the NACA cowling was not), and in any case, at 1930s airspeeds, the effect was negligible.

See also
NACA airfoil
NACA duct
Townend ring

References

Other source
Aeronautic exhibit in Smithsonian Institution, Washington, D.C.

External links

 Abstract of NACA TN 301 report and .pdf file
 Archive of NACA reports 1917-1958

Aerodynamics
Aircraft components
Cowling